Harold Percival Sidney Kelley (1880-1948) was a rugby league footballer in the New South Wales Rugby Football League premiership in rugby league's founding season in Australia.

Kelley played for the Eastern Suburbs club in the years 1908 and 1909. A  Kelley played in the NSWRL's first premiership decider.

Kelley is remembered as the Sydney Roosters 17th player.

References

 The Encyclopedia Of Rugby League Players, Alan Whiticker and Glen Hudson

Australian rugby league players
Sydney Roosters players
1880 births
1948 deaths
Place of birth missing
Rugby league five-eighths